Reunited is the fifth studio album released by Gloria Jones in 1982.

Here is the description written on the back of the album:

Track listing
Side One:

"Body Heat" (Ed Cobb) 4:41
"Tell Me Some More of Your Lies" (Ed Cobb, Gloria Jones) 3:30
"I'm Going to Run Away With Him Tonight" (Ed Cobb) 3:47
"Tainted Love" (Ed Cobb) 2:11

Side Two:

"The Touch of Venus" (Ed Cobb) 4:35
"Sixty Minutes of Making Love" (Ed Cobb) 4:25
"1980 Baby" (Ed Cobb, Gloria Jones, Ron Baron) 4:50
"My Bad Boy's Coming Home" (Ed Cobb) 2:41

Production 
Producer: Ed Cobb
Executive Producer: Ray Harris & Ed Cobb
Arranger/Conductor: Cobb, Lewis, Page
Mixed: Russ Castillo
Engineer: Russ Castillo

1982 albums
Gloria Jones albums
Albums produced by Ed Cobb